Country Music Heaven is a studio album by American country singer-songwriter Bill Anderson. It was released in February 1993 on Curb Records and was produced by Mike Johnson. His 34th studio album, the project also marked Anderson's second release for the Curb label. The album was a collection of gospel recordings, which totaled to 12 tracks.

Background, content and release
Country Music Heaven was recorded in two separate locations: the Hilltop Studio (located in Nashville, Tennessee) and Bradley's Barn (located in Mount Juliet, Tennessee). The sessions were produced by Mike Johnson, Anderson's band leader in his touring band. Johnson had produced some of Anderson's previous album releases. Country Music Heaven was Anderson's second album for the Curb label, with his first being a compilation set issued in 1991. The project was a collection of 12 gospel music recordings.

It was Anderson's second album of gospel recordings. He was inspired to record the cut because his grandfather was a Methodist preacher. Anderson often performed many of the songs featured on the collection in church gatherings. Two of the album's track were new compositions by Anderson himself: "Footprints in the Sand" and "Serenity Prayer". Additional tracks were cover versions of traditional gospel and inspirational songs. Country Music Heaven was released in February 1993 on Curb Records, becoming his 34th studio recording. The project was issued as a cassette and compact disc. The album's title track was released as a single in 1992, receiving a review from Billboard, which compared the song to that of Garth Brooks. The album itself was reviewed by Allmusic, who only gave the release 2.5 out of 3 possible stars.

Track listing

CD version

Cassette version

Personnel
All credits are adapted from the liner notes of Country Music Heaven.

Musical personnel
 Bill Anderson – lead vocals
 Kelly Black – guitar
 Gene Chrisman – drums
 Greg Dotson – drums
 Glen Duncan – fiddle, mandolin
 Lee Hilliard – background vocals
 Dirk Johnson – keyboards, piano
 Kirk Johnson – harmonica
 Mike Johnson – dobro, steel guitar
 Roger Morris – piano
 Larry Paxton – electric bass, upright bass
 Michael Severs – acoustic guitar, electric guitar
 Lester Earl Singer – acoustic guitar, dobro

Technical personnel
 Bill Anderson – arrangement
 Dennis Carney – photography
 Mike Johnson – producer
 Don Ovens – liner notes

Release history

References

1993 albums
Bill Anderson (singer) albums
Christian music albums by American artists
Curb Records albums